Grok is an open-source web framework based on Zope Toolkit (ZTK) technology. The project was started in 2006 by a number of Zope developers. Its core technologies (Martian, grokcore.component) are also used in other Zope-based projects.

The primary motive behind Grok is to make the Zope Toolkit technology more accessible and easier to use for newcomers and, at the same time, speed up application development, in accordance with the agile programming paradigm.
To achieve this, Grok uses convention-over-configuration instead of using an explicit XML based configuration language (ZCML) as Zope Toolkit and BlueBream do. Grok uses Python code for component configuration, and has many implicit defaults and conventions. Grok is similar in feel to other Python Web frameworks such as TurboGears, Pylons and Django.

References

External links
 

Python (programming language) software
Python (programming language) web frameworks